The Power Within is a 1921 American silent drama film directed by Lem F. Kennedy and starring William H. Tooker, Nellie Parker Spaulding and Pauline Garon.

Cast
 William H. Tooker as Job Armstrong
 Nellie Parker Spaulding as Mrs. Armstrong
 Robert Kenyon as Bob Armstrong
 Dorothy Allen as Dorothy Armstrong
 Robert Bentley as Count Bazaine
 Pauline Garon as Pauline
 Wlliam Zohlmen as Little Bobby

References

Bibliography
 Liebman, Roy. The Wampas Baby Stars: A Biographical Dictionary, 1922-1934. McFarland, 2000.
 Munden, Kenneth White. The American Film Institute Catalog of Motion Pictures Produced in the United States, Part 1. University of California Press, 1997.

External links
 

1921 films
1921 drama films
1920s English-language films
American silent feature films
Silent American drama films
American black-and-white films
Pathé Exchange films
1920s American films
English-language drama films